The discography of the Millionaires consists of one studio album, three extended plays, one mixtape and five singles. The group released their debut EP, Bling Bling Bling!, in July 2008, followed by their second EP Just Got Paid, Let's Get Laid in June 2009. The EP the now-duo released was a free mixtape, Your Girl Does Party in May 2012, followed by their debut studio album Tonight in March 2013. Various songs remain unreleased with no confirmed release date, such as "Hush Little Boyfriend", "That's How We Party", "Rich Girls", "Not Everyone's A Millionaire", "Hairspray", "Candy Paint", "Beatbox", a song featured on Ashley Purdy's Instagram. As well as two unreleased features one on a song rumored to be "Fuck Me I'm Famous" dubbed "Team Fierce" alongside Jeffree Star and Blood on the Dance Floor and Young Scrap's song "Phantom".

Studio albums

Extended plays

Mixtapes

Singles

Myspace songs
 "Be My Baby"
 "Gangstar"
 "Hoe Down"
 "Le Freak"
 "Martinis and Mixed Feelings"
 "The One"
 "Painted Whore"
 "Take a Shot"
 "Up in My Bubble" (feat. Ultraviolet Sound)
 "The Weekend"
 "That’s How We Party"
 "Hush Little Boyfriend"

Music videos

Guest appearances
Melissa and Allison appear in Breathe Carolina's "Diamonds" music video.
Former member Dani appeared in Kylie Minogue's "Wow" music video as a backup dancer.
Melissa appeared in Breathe Carolina's "Hit and Run" music video.
Melissa and Allison appear in Deuce's "I Came to Party" music video.
Melissa appeared in Far East Movement's "Ain't Coming Down (Yeah I'm Trippin mix) music video.
Melissa and Allison appear in Wade Martin's music videos "Make It Bump" and "Get Lit".

References

Discographies of American artists